Hannu Mauri Antero Kapanen (born March 13, 1951, in Kontiolahti, Finland) is a retired professional ice hockey player who played in the SM-liiga.  He played for Jokerit and HIFK.  He was inducted into the Finnish Hockey Hall of Fame in 2005.

Hannu Kapanen has also had a long and successful career as head coach in SM-liiga.

Personal life
Hannu's sons Sami and Kimmo and his brother  are former professional ice hockey players.

References

External links
 Finnish Hockey Hall of Fame bio

1951 births
Living people
Finnish ice hockey forwards
HIFK (ice hockey) players
Ice hockey players at the 1976 Winter Olympics
Jokerit players
Jokipojat players
Olympic ice hockey players of Finland
People from Kontiolahti
Sportspeople from North Karelia
Finnish ice hockey coaches